Sahara Beck (born 1996) is an Australian singer and songwriter, from the Sunshine Coast. She has released two studio albums: Volume One (2011) and Panacea (2016), and three EPs: You Could Be Happy (2013), Bloom (2014) and Queen of Hearts (2019). Beck has won multiple Queensland Music Awards.

Early life
Beck was born in Darwin, Northern Territory in 1996, and comes from a musical family. As a child, she used to watch Mary Poppins which inspired Beck to sing. She took on vocal lessons, piano lessons, guitar lessons and trumpet lessons.

Musical career

2009–2011: Early years and Volume One
By the age of 13 she dazzled the local musician, Harii Bandhu, by joining to sing with him on her Dad's birthday party. Bandhu took on a mentoring role for Beck and has given her opportunities to perform on live gigs, as she has written numerous original songs which Bandhu later refined and recorded nine with Geir Brillian. In 2011 her debut album was then formed, Volume One when she was only 15 years of age upon release.

2011–2015: You Could Be Happy and Bloom
In 2012, Beck moved to Brisbane to continue High School at the Music Industry College, she had made a quick impression in the local industry when two of her songs were nominated and taking home an award at the Queensland Music Awards 2012. She has earned a lot of radio play on Australian broadcasters such as ABC Coast FM, HOT 91.1, Triple J, Triple J Unearthed and numerous overseas broadcasters such as in the UK, Germany and New York City.

She was nominated for Song of the Year at the 2012 Queensland Music Awards for her song "You Could Be Happy" and won an award for the category: Schools (Grade 6 -12).

In 2013 she released her EP You Could Be Happy, which contains her singles, "Bang Bang Bang" and "C'mon Man You're Dead".

She supported her second EP, Bloom released in 2014, with her Australian Bloom Tour featuring her hit singles "Brother, Sister" and "Pretender" and receiving "an impressive amount of radio play across a number of stations."

Beck won an award in the Queensland Music Awards 2015 in the peoples choice for Most Popular Female.

In 2015, Beck went on tour with Katie Noonan with their Songs That Made Me album. She also sang alongside Noonan for a track she recorded with Grammy Award nominee Sia.

2016–present: Panacea and touring
In 2016 Beck released Panacea, featuring the single "Here it Comes".  The new album was followed by further touring, including appearances with Xavier Rudd and The Cat Empire.

Beck sang "Somewhere Only We Know", backed by the Queensland Symphony Orchestra for a 2017 Queensland Tourism television advertising campaign.

In August 2018, Beck released a new single titled "Here We Go Again" under new label Dew Process, and later released a music video for it too. She later announced her national Here We Go Again Tour that was performed in September and November of that year.

On 28 March 2019, Beck released a new single titled "I Haven't Done a Thing Today", produced by ARIA Award-nominated Tony Buchen. A lyric video was later released on 3 April. Sahara beck is slated to appear at Noosa Alive! hosted by Triple J on 24 July.

Discography

Extended plays

Singles

Awards and nominations

Queensland Music Awards
The Queensland Music Awards (previously known as Q Song Awards) are annual awards celebrating Queensland, Australia's brightest emerging artists and established legends. They commenced in 2006.

 (wins only)
|-
| 2012
| "You Could Be Happy"
| Schools (Grade 6-12) Song of the Year
| 
|-
| 2015
| Herself
| The BOQ People's Choice Award Most Popular Female
| 
|-
| 2016
| "Mother Mother"
| Folk Song of the Year
| 
|-
| 2019
| "Here We Go Again"
| Regional Song of the Year
| 
|-

Vanda & Young Global Songwriting Competition
The Vanda & Young Global Songwriting Competition is an annual competition that "acknowledges great songwriting whilst supporting and raising money for Nordoff-Robbins" and is coordinated by Albert Music and APRA AMCOS. It commenced in 2009.

|-
| 2019
| "Here We Go Again"
| Vanda & Young Global Songwriting Competition
| style="background:tan;"| 3rd
|-

References

Australian singer-songwriters
Musicians from Brisbane
Australian indie rock musicians
1996 births
Living people
21st-century Australian singers
Dew Process artists
21st-century Australian women singers
Australian women singer-songwriters